Rabia School was a private Islamic faith school located in Luton, Bedfordshire, England. The school was owned and operated by a charitable trust (Rabia Education Trust). It was the first Islamic school to offer secondary education in Bedfordshire.

History
Rabia School was established in January 1996 as a girls school with only seven pupils of primary age on the school register in a residential building. In October 2005 the school expanded by acquiring new, bigger premises for a boys school. The school then became a full-time primary and secondary independent school for girls and boys aged 5–16 years. Additionally, the school site also incorporated a nursery school for children aged 2–5.

Girls and boys attending the school were taught separately in different buildings. The school claimed to offer a mainstream education, but also had courses and subjects tailored to the Islamic faith. Special courses included Arabic, Urdu, as well as Aalim courses, and the chance for some pupils to memorise the whole of the Quran.

An Ofsted inspection in May 2014 rated the school as 'inadequate' and a monitoring inspection in January 2015 found that the school was still not meeting independent school standards. The inspections found that teaching was inadequate, and was undermining British values because of restricted educational opportunities for girls. The school has since claimed that it is addressing the issues highlighted in the inspections. However the school previously criticised the 2014 inspection report as being “strongly politically and media led...especially with the recent fallout of the alleged Trojan Horse inquiry in Birmingham”.

In April 2016 Ofsted chief Sir Michael Wilshaw revealed that he has written to the Secretary of State for Education twice about Rabia School. The letters warn of serious concerns about staff segregation at the school, with male and female staff being segregated during meetings and training. While Sir Michael conceded that the school had improved in many areas, has warned that staff segregation will prevent the school from moving up from an 'inadequate' rating. In May 2016 the Charity Commission announced it was formally investigating the school.

In 2019 the school was banned from admitting new pupils. In November 2020 it was announced that the Department for Education would apply to formally close the school due to repeated failings. The school appealed this decision, however it formally closed as a school in September 2021. Rabia Education Trust continues to offer private tuition and support for home schooling.

References

External links
Rabia Education Trust website

Defunct Islamic schools in England
Educational institutions established in 1996
Defunct schools in Luton
1996 establishments in England
Educational institutions disestablished in 2021
2021 disestablishments in England